This article lists the principal units of the Foreign Legion in the French Army created since 1831. Legion units are only cited once, based on their respective dates of creation. A dissolved Legion unit which is recreated under the same designation will only appear once. The last section of the list re-summarizes actual Legion units in service.

19th century 
French Foreign Legion (1st formation) - 9 March 1831
2nd Foreign Legion (2LE) (2nd formation) - 3 February 1836
1st Foreign Regiment - 1 April 1841
2nd Foreign Infantry Regiment – 1 April 1841
 Foreign Brigade (unit designation in 1854 for two merged foreign regiments during the Crimean War)
Mounted Companies (Compagnies montées de la Légion étrangère) – 1881
Saharan Companies of the French Foreign Legion, Saharan Companies and Squadrons of the French Foreign Legion – (CSPLE, ESPLE) – 1901
1st Marching Regiment of the 2nd Foreign Regiment (1erRM 2eRE) - 1907
1st Marching Regiment of the 1st Foreign Regiment (1e RM 1er RE) - 1913

World War I 

2nd Marching Regiment of the 2nd Foreign Regiment (2e RM 2e RE) - end of August 1914
 2nd Marching Regiment of the 1st Foreign Regiment (2e RM 1er RE) - September 1914
 3rd Marching Regiment of the 1st Foreign Regiment (3e RM 1er RE) - (first called Marching Regiment of the Foreign Legion entrenched camp of Paris) – September 1914
 4th Marching Regiment of the 1st Foreign Regiment (4e RM 1er RE) - 5 November 1914
Marching Regiment of the Foreign Legion (RMLE) - 11 November 1915

Interwar period 
3rd Foreign Infantry Regiment (3e RE), ex-RMLE – 15 November 1920
4th Foreign Infantry Regiment (4e REI) – 15 November 1920
1st Foreign Cavalry Regiment (1er REC) - 1921 
Demi-Brigade of the Foreign Legion in Indochina (DBLE) - 2 August 1930
5th Foreign Infantry Regiment (5e REI) - 1 September 1930
Foreign Legion Command (COMLE) - successive appellations and designations IILE (1931), GALE (1950), COLE (1955), ITLE (1957), GLE (1972) and COMLE (1984) - 1 April 1931. 
Communal Depot of the Foreign Regiments - successive appellations and designations DCRE (1933) and DCLE (1950) – 13 October 1933. 
2nd Foreign Cavalry Regiment - 1 July 1939

World War II 
 Marching Regiments of Foreign Volunteers (1er, 2e and 3e RMVE) - 29 September 1939, became the 21e, 22e, 23e RMVE 
6th Foreign Infantry Regiment (6e REI) - 1 October 1939
11th Foreign Infantry Regiment (11e REI) - 6 November 1939 
97th Reconnaissance Group of the Infantry Division - GRD 97 (first called GRDI 180) – 1 December 1939 
12th Foreign Infantry Regiment (12e REI) – 24 February 1940
13th Demi-Brigade of the Foreign Legion (13e DBLE) (first called 13th Light Mountain Demi-Brigade) – became the 13e DBLE on 12 November 1940
21st Marching Regiment of Foreign Volunteers – (21e RMVE) -  first called 1er RMVE – 29 September 1939
22nd Marching Regiment of Foreign Volunteers (22e RMVE) first called 2e RMVE – 24 October 1939
23rd Marching Regiment of Foreign Volunteers (23e RMVE) – first called 3e RMVE – May 1940

Decolonization

Indochina War 
Disciplinary Company of the Foreign Regiments in the Far East (CDRE/EO) – 1 June 1946 
Passage Company of the Foreign Legion (CPLE) of the Far East - 1 May 1947
Armored Train of the Foreign Legion (TBLE) - 1948 
Parachute Company of the 3rd Foreign Infantry Regiment - Para Co. 3rd Foreign Infantry Regiment (3e REI) - 1 April 1948 - later designations: 1st Foreign Parachute Battalion (1er BEP)   
1st Foreign Parachute Regiment – later names and designations: 1st Foreign Parachute Battalion (1er BEP) - 1948 and (1er REP) - 1955 – 1 July 1948 
2nd Foreign Parachute Regiment – successive appellations and designations, 2e BEP (1948) and 2e REP (1955) – 9 October 1948. 
3rd Foreign Parachute Regiment - successive appellations and designations, 3rd Foreign Parachute Battalion (3e BEP - 1949 and 3e REP - 1955) – November 1949
 Foreign Air Supply Company (CERA) – 1 January 1951
1st Foreign Parachute Heavy Mortar Company (1re CEPML) – 1 September 1953

Algerian War

After 1962 
61st Mixed Legion Engineer Battalion – 61e BMGL - 1963 
5th Mixed Regiment of the Pacific 5e RMP (ex-5e REI) – October 1963. 
5th Heavy Weight Transport Company (CTGP) – 5e CTGP – 1 May 1965. 
Foreign Legion Detachment in Mayotte successive designations and appellations DLEC (1973) and DLEM (1975) – 2 August 1973. 
6th Foreign Engineer Regiment – 6e REG – 1 July 1984. 
1st Foreign Engineer Regiment – 1er REG (ex-6e REG) – 1 July 1999. 
2nd Foreign Engineer Regiment – 2e REG – 1 July 1999. 
Foreign Legion Recruiting Group – GRLE – 1 July 2007.

Current Legion units 
Commandement de la Légion étrangère – COMLE.
 Groupement de recrutement de la Légion étrangère (GRLE) 
1er Régiment étranger (1er RE) 
1er Régiment Étranger de Cavalerie (1er REC)
1er Régiment étranger de génie (1e REG)
2e Régiment étranger de parachutistes (2e REP) 
2e Régiment étranger de infanterie (2e REI)
2e Régiment Etranger de Génie (2e REG)
3e Régiment étranger d'infanterie (3e REI)
4e Régiment étranger (4e RE)
13e Demi-Brigade de Légion Étrangère (13e DBLE)
Détachement de Légion étrangère de Mayotte
Musique de la Légion étrangère (MLE)

See also 

Major (France)
Origins of the French Foreign Legion
History of the French Foreign Legion

References

Notes

Sources 
 Le Livre d’Or de la Légion étrangère (1831-1955) (Golden Book of the Legion 1831-1955), Jean Brunon et Georges Manue, éditions Charles Lavauzelle et Cie, 1958.
 Histoire de la Légion, de Narvik à Kolwesi, (The History of the Legion from Narvik to Kolwesi), Henri Le Mire, éditions Albin Michel, 1978, 
 Division Communication et Information de la Légion étrangère (Communication and Information Division of the French Foreign Legion). 
 Division Histoire et Patrimoine de la Légion étrangère (History and Patrimony Division of the French Foreign Legion). 
 Monsieur Légionnaire - Général (cr) Hallo Jean - Lavauzelle – 1994
Centre de documentation de la Légion étrangère (Center of Documentation of the French Foreign Legion).

Lists of military units and formations of France
Units of the French Foreign Legion